Jennifer Taylor is an American actress. She is best known for her roles as Cortana in Halo games and the intelligent personal assistant.

Career
Jen Taylor taught herself how to do voice work by recording the radio and imitating what she heard. She graduated from Northwestern University with a degree in theater. Before starting in voice work, she worked as a radio DJ for KNDD.

Taylor has voiced characters in video games, Princess Peach, Toad, and Toadette in Mario games between 1999 and 2006. She voiced the character Cortana in Halo games since the first game in the series, Halo: Combat Evolved (2001). She also voices the virtual assistant Cortana. Two decades following the original game, Taylor reprised the role of Cortana by voice acting and performance capture in the Paramount+ TV series.

Taylor has played Salem in the web series RWBY, since 2013. She voiced an episode of the radio series The Classic Adventures of Sherlock Holmes

Taylor has narrated nearly 30 audiobooks, and has received several AudioFile Earphones Awards. Her narration of Tami Hoag's Mismatch was nominated for an Audie Award in 2009.

As a stage actress, Taylor has played Elizabeth Bennet in Pride and Prejudice and Eliza Doolittle in a Seattle Shakespeare Company production of Pygmalion.

Filmography

Live-action

Animation

Video games

Other works

References

External links
 
 
 Bungie's 2002 interview with Jen Taylor

Living people
American film actresses
American television actresses
American video game actresses
American voice actresses
American web series actresses
Nintendo people
Northwestern University alumni
Year of birth missing (living people)
20th-century American actresses
21st-century American actresses